Domenico Pellegrini (1759 – 1840), was an Italian painter.

Biography
He was born in Galliera Veneta and became the pupil of Lodovico Gallina. He was active in Venice, Rome, London, Paris, Lisbon, and Naples and is known for portraits and historical allegories.
He died in Rome.

References

Domenico Pellegrini on Artnet

1759 births
1840 deaths
18th-century Italian painters
Italian male painters
19th-century Italian painters
Painters from Padua
19th-century Italian male artists
18th-century Italian male artists